Homicide: Life on the Street is a  police procedural television series that began airing on the NBC network immediately after Super Bowl XXVII on January 31, 1993, before moving to Wednesday evenings for the remainder of the first season. The show temporarily replaced L.A. Law on Thursday evenings at 10:00 p.m. ET for its limited season 2 run. From season 3 on it aired Fridays at 10:00 p.m. ET. Homicide: Life on the Street chronicled the work of a fictional Baltimore Police Department homicide unit. The show ran for seven seasons on the NBC network from 1993 to 1999, 122 episodes in all, followed by a made-for-television movie in 2000. The series was based on David Simon's nonfiction book Homicide: A Year on the Killing Streets (1991), and many characters and stories used throughout the show's seven seasons were based on individuals and events depicted in the book.

Series overview

Episodes
When first shown on network television, multiple episodes were aired out of order. The DVD present the episodes in the correct chronological order, restoring all storylines and character developments.

Season 1 (1993)

Season 2 (1994)

Season 3 (1994–95)

Season 4 (1995–96)

Note: On February 7, 1996, "Charm City", the 13th episode of Law & Order's sixth season, aired before the next episode of Homicide to air, "For God and Country", which directly followed the events of that episode.

Season 5 (1996–97)

Season 6 (1997–98)

Season 7 (1998–99)

Television film (2000)

Home media releases

References

External links

 
 
 

Homicide: Life on the Street